Laurens may refer to:

Places

United States
 Laurens County, Georgia
 Laurens, Iowa, a city
 Laurens (town), New York
 Laurens (village), New York
 Laurens, South Carolina, a city
 Laurens County, South Carolina
 Fort Laurens, an American Revolutionary War fort in what is now Ohio

Elsewhere
 Laurens, Hérault, commune in the Hérault département, southern France
 Laurens Peninsula, Heard Island, Indian Ocean
 Cape Laurens, on the Laurens Peninsula

Other uses 
 Laurens (given name)
 Laurens (surname)
 USS Laurens (APA-153), a World War II attack transport ship
 Laurens Railroad (1854-1881), a railroad in South Carolina
 Laurens Railway (1881-1894), successor of the Laurens Railroad
 Laurens (horse) (born 2015), thoroughbred racehorse

See also 
 Laurenz (name)
 Lawrence (disambiguation)
 Lourens (disambiguation)